Sapna Na Vavetar (Gujarati : સપના નાં  વાવેતર, meaning Sowing the dreams) was a Gujarati daily soap being aired on DD Gujarati during 90s (1996–97). Later on, due to its sheer success and popularity, its Hindi version was created and was aired on SET with the serial name Ek Mahal Ho Sapno Ka. This was also very famous and gained lot of popularity and set a trend for TV serial industries for family serial drama.

1996 Indian television series debuts
1997 Indian television series endings
Gujarati-language television shows